Billel Messaoudi (born 21 December 1997) is an Algerian footballer who plays for Belgian club Kortrijk.

Club career
On 31 May 2022, Messaoudi moved to Kortrijk on a four-year contract, after playing there on loan in the previous season.

References

External links 

1997 births
21st-century Algerian people
People from Bouïra Province
Living people
Algerian footballers
Association football forwards
Algeria youth international footballers
Algeria under-23 international footballers
JS Saoura players
WA Tlemcen players
K.V. Kortrijk players
Algerian Ligue Professionnelle 1 players
Belgian Pro League players
Algerian expatriate footballers
Expatriate footballers in Belgium
Algerian expatriate sportspeople in Belgium